Mwatate Constituency is an electoral constituency in Kenya. It is one of four constituencies in Taita-Taveta County. The constituency was established for the 1988 elections.

Members of Parliament

Locations and wards

References

External links 
Map of the constituency

Constituencies in Taita-Taveta County
Constituencies in Coast Province
1988 establishments in Kenya
Constituencies established in 1988